The Manzanilla Formation is a geologic formation in Trinidad and Tobago. It preserves fossils dating back to the Middle Miocene period.

Fossil content 
Among others, the formation has provided fossils of:
 Lamprogrammus manzanilla

See also 

 List of fossiliferous stratigraphic units in Trinidad and Tobago

References

Bibliography 
 

Geologic formations of Trinidad and Tobago
Neogene Trinidad and Tobago
Paleontology in Trinidad and Tobago